Niamh McDonald, was runner up in the business reality TV show The Irish Apprentice in 2010.

Niamh finished as runner up to winner Michelle Massey Michelle Massey in a closely contested final.

Task wins: 10/13.
Task wins as project manager: 3.

Niamh from Wexford Wexford is the youngest of 7 children. She graduated with an honors degree in Business Studies and Marketing from the University of Limerick and was working as a Marketing Manager before entering the show.

After the airing of the show Niamh was head-hunted by Facebook to join their Sales Team.

In 2016 she became engaged to fellow contestant Will McCreevy.

References

Living people
Year of birth missing (living people)
People from the Republic of Ireland
The Apprentice (Irish TV series) candidates